Muddy "Mississippi" Waters – Live is a live album by Muddy Waters. It was recorded during the tour to support Muddy Waters' album Hard Again and it features the same musicians, including James Cotton and Johnny Winter, who had produced the album.

Critical reception 
Village Voice critic Robert Christgau wrote: "Age cannot wither nor Johnny Winter whelm the elan of this boyish man. It may not last forever, though—he really seems to mean 'Deep Down in Florida.' Sun shines every day, you can play in the sand with your wife, and maybe work on a slow one called 'Condominium Blues' in your spare time."

Track listing
All tracks composed by McKinley Morganfield; except where indicated

"Mannish Boy" (Morganfield, Ellas McDaniel, Mel London) (4:24)
"She’s Nineteen Years Old" (5:21)
"Nine Below Zero" (Sonny Boy Williamson) (5:21)
"Streamline Woman" (4:39)
"Howling Wolf" (6:00)
"Baby Please Don’t Go" (4:07)
"Deep Down in Florida" (9:48)

In 2003 the album was reissued as a two-CD set; the second disc contained 11 previously unreleased performances recorded during shows on August 25 and 26, 1978 at Harry Hope's in Cary, IL:

"Medley: After Hours/Stormy Monday Blues" (Avery Parrish, Buddy Feyne, Robert Bruce, Aaron "T-Bone" Walker) (12:00)
"Trouble No More" (2:49)
"Champagne and Reefer" (4:52)
"Corrina, Corrina" (2:49)
"Hoochie Coochie Man" (Willie Dixon) (3:10)
"She Moves Me" (6:19)
"Kansas City" (Jerry Leiber, Mike Stoller) (9:30)
"Pinetop's Boogie Woogie" (C. "Pinetop" Smith) (4:59)
"Mad Love" (I Want You To Love Me) (Willie Dixon) (4:16)
"Everything's Gonna Be Alright" (Walter Jacobs) (5:21)
"Got My Mojo Working" (Preston Foster) (3:13)

In 2007 a third album from the same tour, Breakin' It Up, Breakin' It Down was released. It features material from three concerts (March 4 at the Palladium in New York City, March 6 at the Tower Theater in Upper Darby, Pennsylvania, and March 18 at the Masonic Temple Theater in Detroit) where Muddy Waters performed along James Cotton and Johnny Winter.

Personnel
Muddy Waters - slide guitar, vocals
Johnny Winter - guitar (songs 1, 5, 7), additional vocals (song 1)
Bob Margolin - guitar
Luther “Guitar Jr.” Johnson - guitar (songs 1, 2, 4, 6)
Calvin "Fuzz" Jones - bass (songs 1, 2, 4-6)
Willie "Big Eyes" Smith - drums
Pinetop Perkins - piano
Jerry Portnoy - harp (songs 1, 2, 4, 6)
James Cotton - harp (songs 3, 5)
Charles Calmese - bass (songs 3, 7)

Production staff
Produced: Johnny Winter
Mixing, production consultant and engineer: Dave Still
Mixing assistant: Dave Prentice
Mastering: Greg Calbi
Photography: Jim Marshall
Design: Paula Scher
Mixed at the Schoolhouse and Hit Factory
Location recordings by Metro Audio and Record Plant

References

Muddy Waters live albums
1979 live albums
Live blues albums
Albums produced by Johnny Winter
Grammy Award for Best Ethnic or Traditional Folk Recording
Blue Sky Records live albums